Stephen Victor Wilson (born March 26, 1941) is a United States district judge of the United States District Court for the Central District of California.

Education and career

Wilson has claimed that he was born in New York City, New York, although his parents were in Connecticut when he was born.  Wilson received a Bachelor of Arts degree from Lehigh University in 1963. He received a Juris Doctor from Brooklyn Law School in 1967. He received a Master of Laws from George Washington University Law School in 1973. He was a trial attorney of the Tax Division of the United States Department of Justice from 1968 to 1971. He was an Assistant United States Attorney of Los Angeles, California from 1971 to 1977. He was the Chief of the Fraud and Special Prosecutions Section from 1973 to 1977. He was in private practice of law in Beverly Hills, California from 1977 to 1985. He was an adjunct professor of law at Loyola Law School from 1975 to 1979. He was the Chairman of the Federal Indigent Defense Panel Committee of the District Court in Los Angeles from 1979 to 1980. He was an adjunct professor of law at the University of San Diego School of Law in 1984.

Federal judicial service

Wilson was nominated by President Ronald Reagan on September 9, 1985, to the United States District Court for the Central District of California, to a new seat created by Pub. L. No. 98-353, 98 Stat. 333 (1984). He was confirmed by the United States Senate on October 16, 1985, and received his commission on October 17, 1985.

Notable cases

Wilson is considered a tough-minded conservative, however, he is described as "never making a decision with fear or favor."

In 1988, Wilson threw out provisions of a 1952 immigration law that the government used to deport aliens who advocate world communism. He also presided over the 2002 case of Sherman Austin.

References

Living people
1941 births
Assistant United States Attorneys
Brooklyn Law School alumni
George Washington University Law School alumni
Judges of the United States District Court for the Central District of California
Lehigh University alumni
United States district court judges appointed by Ronald Reagan
20th-century American judges
University of San Diego faculty
20th-century American Jews
21st-century American judges
21st-century American Jews